The American Commerce Center was a proposed supertall skyscraper approved for construction in Philadelphia, Pennsylvania but cancelled due to the 2008 recession. The Comcast Innovation and Technology Center now stands on the site.

The connection would have consisted of a multi-story skybridge  with a garden on top.

Of several supertall skyscrapers proposed for Philadelphia (including the Center City Tower and an early version of Comcast Center), this would have been the first to be constructed. 

The building would have been the tallest building in the United States by official height, or the second tallest by pinnacle height (including antennas) behind the Willis Tower at  until the completion of  One World Trade Center in New York City in 2014.

On June 19, 2008, Philadelphia City Councilman Darrell Clarke introduced changes for the zoning legislation around 18th and Arch Streets which was the first step towards building the tower. On November 18, 2008, the City Planning Commission signed off on legislation needed for the zoning changes. According to the Philadelphia Daily News, "the developers will have to come back for approval of their building plan if Council passes the zoning bills." On December 11, 2008, the zoning changes in question were unanimously approved by City Council. 

On August 19, 2011, Liberty Property Trust acquired the development site from Hill International Real Estate Partners for a reported $40 million, which equates to $612 per square-foot ($2,008 per square-meter). The same company constructed the nearby Comcast Center and Liberty Place complex. However, the project was cancelled.

See also

List of tallest buildings in the world
List of tallest buildings in the United States
List of tallest buildings in Philadelphia

References

External links
Official American Commerce Center website

Proposed skyscrapers in the United States
Skyscrapers in Philadelphia
Kohn Pedersen Fox buildings